Félix Casanova de Ayala (1915–1990) was a Spanish poet.

Biography 
He begins his poetic activity, forming part of the "Second hour" of the "postista" movement. Later, linked to the group "Pajaro de paja", and in a collection of the same name, he edited his first book "The Contiguous Landscape". He was part of the left-wing nationalist political party Unión del Pueblo Canario.

He also highlighted the literary works of his son Félix Francisco Casanova, who despite having died prematurely at the age of 19 had time to win the Julio Tovar de Poesía (1973) and Benito Pérez awards. He is also the author of a collection of short stories, "La Sirena Y Otras Frustraciones" (1989). The Government of the Canary Islands awarded him the Gold Medal posthumously in 1997.

References

1915 births
1990 deaths
20th-century Spanish poets
Spanish male poets
20th-century Spanish male writers